Mike is a village in Somogy county, Hungary with just over 600 residents.

References

External links 
 Street map (Hungarian)

Populated places in Somogy County
Hungarian German communities in Somogy County